Vincenzo Zinna  (born 26 August 1981) is a Swiss football player who last plays as a midfielder for FC Gossau in the Swiss Challenge League.

Club career
Zinna started his professional career at FC St. Gallen and moved to Grasshopper and then Austria. In summer 2008 he joined Gossau from Austrian side SC Rheindorf Altach.

External links

Player profile – FC Gossau 

1981 births
Living people
Association football midfielders
Swiss men's footballers
FC Gossau players
FC St. Gallen players
SC Rheindorf Altach players
Austrian Football Bundesliga players
Expatriate footballers in Austria